Bellapais Abbey (also spelled Bellapaïs) is the ruin of a monastery built by Canons Regular in the 13th century on the northern side of the small village of Bellapais, now in Turkish-controlled Northern Cyprus, about five kilometres from the town of Kyrenia. The ruin is at an altitude of 220 m above sea level, and commands a long view down to Kyrenia and the Mediterranean sea.

The site is also a museum, which hosts a restaurant and a cafe. The Abbey's refectory now serves as a venue for concerts and lectures. In early summer it is also a venue for a local music festival.

Opening hours from June to mid-September are 9am to 7pm; the winter hours are 9am to 1 pm and 2pm to 4:45pm. Opening hours from mid-September to May are 9am to 5pm. There is an admission charge of 15 TL.

History
The site was formerly named Episcopia or Piscopia, suggesting that it may have served the Bishop of Kyrenia as a residence, and as a place of refuge from Arab raids in the 7th and 8th centuries. The first occupants known to have settled on or near the site were the Canons Regular of the Holy Sepulchre, who had fled Jerusalem after its fall in 1187 to Saladin. The canons had been the custodians of the Church of the Holy Sepulchre.

Aimery de Lusignan founded the monastery, with the first buildings dating to between 1198–1205. The abbey was consecrated as the Abbey of St. Mary of the Mountain. The White Canons (Norbertines or Premonstratensians) succeeded the founding canons in 1206. Consequently, documents from the 15th and 16th century refer to Bellapais as the "White Abbey". The common explanation of the modern name Bellapais is that the French name  ("Abbey of Peace") was corrupted after the Italian takeover into "Bellapais", reinterpreted as  "Beautiful Land". George Francis Hill was unconvinced of both the French and Italian portions of this derivation.  Blessed Anne Catherine Emmerich says that this was the ancient Jewish village of "Mallep," visited by Jesus Christ. 

The main building as it can be seen today was built during the rule of King Hugh III 1267–1284. The cloisters and the refectory were constructed during the rule of King Hugh IV between 1324–1359. Hugh IV lived in the abbey and had apartments constructed for his use.

In 1373, the Genoese raided Kyrenia, almost destroying Kyrenia Castle. The Genoese stripped Bellapais of anything that was portable and of any value.

By 1489 the Venetians had taken control of Cyprus. By the time of the Venetians, the inhabitants of the Abbey had abandoned the Premonstratensian Rule. Reportedly, canons took wives, and then to keep the business within the family, accepted only their children as novices.

Following the Ottoman conquest of Kyrenia and Kyrenia Castle in 1571, the Ottomans expelled the Premonstratensians and gave the abbey to the Greek Orthodox Church of Cyprus, which they appointed as the only legal Christian church on Cyprus. The Church of Cyprus neglected the Abbey, which fell into disrepair. However, the abbey church itself came to serve as the parish church for the village that grew up around it, and whose inhabitants may have used the abbey as a quarry for stone.

During the period of British control of Cyprus (1878-1960), the British Army initially took control of Bellapais. In 1878 they cemented the floor of the refectory, which they then used as a hospital. Unfortunately, the soldiers also fired off small arms in the refectory; one may still see bullet holes in the east wall. Then in 1912 George Jeffery, Curator of the Ancient Monuments of Cyprus, undertook repairs of the abbey.

Structure

The abbey consists of a church and a cloister, with most of the monastic buildings surrounding the cloister. In Britain these would normally be built on the south side of the church to shelter the living quarters from the cold air from the north. At Bellapais, the monastic buildings are on the north, probably to be cooler, although occasionally the lay of the land dictated position.

The Abbey's main entrance is through a fortified gate on the south side, with a tower that is a later addition, and a forecourt. The gateway replaced an earlier drawbridge.

The church, which dates to the 13th century, itself borders the courtyard and is the best preserved part of the complex. The Italian murals on the facade may date to the 15th century. The church has a flat roof and a belfry, with only one surviving bell, above the entrance. The church consists of a nave with two side aisles, a choir and a sacristy. The surviving decorations include an intricately carved pulpit, the bishop's throne, and five chandeliers. It is possible that the graves of several Lusignan kings rest beneath the floor of the church.

The forecourt leads to the cloister, which has 18 arches. Under one of the arches on the north side there are two Roman sarcophagi that the canons once used as lavabos. The sarcophagi are one above the other, with the upper one being decorated, and the lower one plain. Water flowed from the upper to the lower, and then out a channel to the cloister garden.

Behind the sarcophagi there is a door that leads to the canons' refectory. The door's lintel contains coats of arms of Cyprus, Jerusalem, and the Lusignans. The refectory is Gothic in design and is the finest room in the Abbey. It includes a pulpit that projects from the north wall, six windows on the north wall that illuminate the space, and a rose window on the eastern wall. The room is 30m long and 10m wide, with seven columns that extend from the side walls to support the roof. While the canons ate their meals, a lector in the pulpit would read to them from the scriptures or the lives of the saints. The six windows provide a lovely view across the countryside to the sea. A door on the western wall leads to the kitchen and to a cellar built under the refectory. The rooms between the refectory and the kitchen may once have been the abbey's lavatories.

The chapter house is on the eastern side of the cloister, as is the undercroft. The chapter house functioned as the abbey's administrative office, and the undercroft contained workrooms. The chapter house has an interesting Gothic stone carving. The carving depicts a man with a double ladder on his back, a second man between two sirens, a woman reading, two beasts attacking a man, a woman with a rosary, a monkey and a cat in the foliage of a pear tree under which there is a man holding a shield, and a canon wearing a cloak. The column in the center of the chapter house may have come from a Byzantine church. The canons' cells were on a second floor, above the chapter house and the undercroft.

There are several stairs from the cloisters. Three give access to the roof. On the south side of the cloister there is a pair of stairs that lead to the abbey's treasury room, which is in the northwest corner of the monastery.

See also
Premonstratensians
Hayton of Corycus

References

 North Cyprus: Bellapais

Medieval Cyprus
Historic sites in Cyprus
Christian monasteries established in the 13th century
Augustinian monasteries
Premonstratensian monasteries
Gothic architecture in Cyprus